Thomas Smith Bowen (May 1, 1808 – October 20, 1883) was a Democratic member of the Wisconsin State Senate. He represented the 8th District in 1852 and the 24th District in 1853. Bowen lived in Waupun, Wisconsin. He died at his residence in Clarno, Wisconsin, where he is buried at Bowen Family Homestead Cemetery.

References

External links

People from Green County, Wisconsin
People from Waupun, Wisconsin
Wisconsin Democrats
1808 births
1883 deaths
19th-century American politicians